is a vertically scrolling shooter video game released for arcades in 1991 by Tecmo. It was ported for the Super Nintendo Entertainment System. The Super NES version was released in Europe under the title Super Strike Gunner and was published by Activision.

The player takes control of a high-tech jet, the "Strike Gunner" of the title. The North American SNES packaging was illustrated by Marc Ericksen. The SNES version also incorporates the use of Mode 7.

Plot
In the far future A.D. 2008 aliens have invaded the Earth and launched a full-scale war that threatens humankind. Earth's scientists have built two of the ultimate weapons, the Strike Gunner, piloted by Mark McKenzie and Jane Sinclair to repel the invasion and destroy the alien armies.

Gameplay

The player goes through various levels and stages, usually based around certain environmental elements and faces numerous types of enemies. The levels feature wave after wave of normal enemies ranging from helicopters to gun turrets that usually only require one or two hits to destroy. At various points in each level, the player faces a boss vehicle. At certain points, a stealth bomber (or in later levels, a space shuttle or capsule) will appear to airdrop the player laser power-ups, recharge special weapons, or give a speed boost.

Using the Strike Gunner, the player is armed with a dual red laser weapon that can be upgraded several times to a more powerful blue laser. In addition to this weapon, the player chooses a second, more powerful "special weapon" with a limited charge before they begin the mission. There are 10 advanced weapons (15 in the SNES version) to pick from. This allows for a strategic approach to the game because certain weapons are more effective on certain missions. The "special weapon" has various limitations, depending on which one is being used.

The game supports two players as well, with two Strike Gunners facing the same missions as single player. This adds another layer of strategy to the game because each player can choose their own "special weapons" and utilize a deadly combination of timed special attacks. Players can link their aircraft in two different ways.

Reception

In Japan, Game Machine listed Strike Gunner S.T.G. on their May 15, 1991 issue as being the eleventh most-successful table arcade unit of the month.

Most of the criticism was based on the poor, unvaried graphics, and the gameplay being repetitive, and dull.

References

External links

1991 video games
Arcade video games
Activision games
Athena (company) games
Science fiction video games
Vertically scrolling shooters
Super Nintendo Entertainment System games
Tecmo games
Top-down video games
Video games developed in Japan
Video games set in the 2090s